Wathlingen (Eastphalian: Wateln) is a municipality in the district of Celle, in Lower Saxony, Germany. It is situated approximately 10 km southeast of Celle.

Wathlingen is also the seat of the Samtgemeinde ("collective municipality") Wathlingen.

References

Celle (district)